Michael Gore (born 1951) is an American composer.

Michael Gore may also refer to:

Michael Gore (MP) for Portsmouth (UK Parliament constituency)
Mike Gore (1878–1953), American film theater owner
Mike Gore (physicist) (1934–2022), professor at the Australian National University